San Cristóbal is a town in the Arenas de Iguña municipality of the Spanish region of Cantabria. The town is also known as Valdeiguña. In the year 2004 its population was 181. The town used to belong to the historical municipality of Valdeiguña, and San Cristóbal has been documented since the middle ages when it was included in the Cartulary of Santillana.

References

External links
Cantabria 102 Municipios 

Towns in Spain